The Ndaka people (of Ndaaka) are an ethnic group of the northeastern Democratic Republic of the Congo, many of whom live in the Mambasa Territory of the Ituri Province.

All young Ndaka men had to be initiated to become full adult members of the tribe.
The ceremonies are held every six years or so, and involve traditional songs and dances.
In some of these special instruments are used, and masked ritualists act out prescribed roles dressed in full costume.

References

Ethnic groups in the Democratic Republic of the Congo